Uj Musa (also Romanized as ‘Ūj Mūsá; also known as Owjālū Mūsá) is a village in Mah Neshan Rural District, in the Central District of Mahneshan County, Zanjan Province, Iran. At the 2006 census, its population was 34, in 7 families.

References 

Populated places in Mahneshan County